Undulambia jonesalis is a moth in the family Crambidae. It is found in Brazil (São Paulo).

References

Moths described in 1906
Musotiminae